Laurence F. Renehan (1797–1857) was an Irish historian, author, administrator and Roman Catholic priest who served as president of St Patrick's College, Maynooth from 1845 to 1857. 

Renehan conducted extensive research on the history of Catholicism in Ireland.

Biography
Renehan was born in 1797 at Longford Pass in the parish of Gurtnahoe, Tipperary. He was educated first at Freshfield and then at Kilkenny. In September 1819, Renehan entered St. Patrick's College as a student for the Archdiocese of Cashel to study logic.  In 1825, Renehan was elected a Dunboyne student. On 15 September 1825, Renehan was appointed junior dean, and a few weeks later was ordained a priest. 

On 27 July 1827 Renehan was elected professor of scripture at St. Patrick's.  He held this position until June 1834, when he became vice-president of the college. From 4 June 1841 to 24 June 1843, Renehan also filled the office of bursar and was instrumental in extricating the college from financial difficulties. In 1845,  Renehan became president of St. Patrick's

While college president, Renehan commissioned Augustus Pugin to construct the buildings on St. Mary's Square at the college.  These buildings include the Russell Library and a large meeting-room that was later named after Renehan.

Renehan was a historian of the development of Catholicism in Ireland. He collected 79 volumes of early Irish Church manuscripts, housed today in the Russell Library.  

Renehan served as St, Patrick's president until his death on 27 July 1857.  He is buried in a small cemetery on the campus.

Works

 Collections on Irish Church History, Vol. 1: Irish Archbishops, not published during his lifetime.  It was later edited by his colleague Daniel McCarthy and published in 1861 by C.M. Warren and Thomas Richardson, Dublin. 
 Requiem Office 
 Choir Manual of Sacred Music
 History of Music.

References

External links
 Maynooth College - Pontifical University (official website)
 National University of Ireland, Maynooth (official website)
 Oxford Dictionary of National Biography entry for Laurence F. Renehan
 Renehan's "History of Music" on Google Books

1797 births
1857 deaths
19th-century Irish Roman Catholic priests
Irish historians of religion
Irish antiquarians
Alumni of St Patrick's College, Maynooth
Presidents of St Patrick's College, Maynooth
Burials at Maynooth College Cemetery